Arethaea phalangium is a species in the family Tettigoniidae ("katydids"), in the order Orthoptera ("grasshoppers, crickets, katydids"). The species is known generally as the "eastern thread-leg katydid".
It is found in North America.

References

Further reading
 Capinera J.L, Scott R.D., Walker T.J. (2004). Field Guide to Grasshoppers, Katydids, and Crickets of the United States. Cornell University Press.
 Otte, Daniel (1997). "Tettigonioidea". Orthoptera Species File 7, 373.
 

Phaneropterinae
Insects described in 1877